Khayyam Metro Station is a station on Tabriz Metro Line 1. The station opened on 27 August 2015. It is located next on Bakeri Boulevard at Khayyam Square near Rajaeishahr neighbourhood. It is between Emam Reza Metro Station and 29 Bahman Metro Station.

References

Tabriz Metro stations
Khayyam Metro station website